Pontus Kaarlo Artti (until 1896 Tegström; 1 January 1878, in Ylitornio – 30 July 1936, in Helsinki) was a Finnish diplomat, journalist and writer.

The parents of Pontus Artti's were the Lensmann Karl Gustaf Tegström and Mathilda Kajander. He graduated from Oulu Lyseo Upper Secondary School in 1896 and initially worked as a theater and journalist. Artti was the Editor-in-Chief of Turun Sanomat in 1910–1917.

Artti was Hankkija's Department Manager from 1918 to 1919 and then transferred to the Foreign Service in 1919. He served as Secretary of State for Foreign Affairs from 1921 to 1927. He was a Finnish Envoy to Moscow in 1927–1930 and in Rome from 1931 to 1936.
 
Pontus Artti was married since 1906 to Eeva Hilda Amanda Wentinref.

References

20th-century diplomats
20th-century Finnish journalists
1936 deaths
1878 births
Finnish diplomats
Finnish writers
People from Ylitornio